Trans Guyana Airways Limited is a Guyanese airline which commenced operations in 1956 in Georgetown, Guyana, with a single float airplane. Since then, the company has expanded their fleet to provide domestic and regional transportation, and to Guyana's remote areas. 

Trans Guyana Airways is a member of the Correia Group of Companies along with Caribbean Aviation Maintenance Services, Evergreen Adventures, Baganara Island Resort and the Correia Mining Company. 

In addition to serving Guyana's interior, Trans Guyana Airways works in cooperation with Gum Air to provide a scheduled air-link between Paramaribo (Suriname) and Georgetown (Guyana). The carriers operate seven days a week between Eugene F. Correira International Airport (SYEC) and Zorg en Hoop Airport (SMZO).

Trans Guyana linked with KLM in 2019 to provide flights from Guyana to the Netherlands via Suriname in 12 hours.

Fleet

Trans Guyana Airways operates a fleet of ten aircraft with capacity varying from nine to 20 seats.

Destinations

Trans Guyana Airways offers scheduled commercial services to the following interior locations:

Barbados
Bridgetown (since November 1, 2020)

Brazil
Boa Vista (since December 21, 2020)

Guyana
Region 1
Mabaruma
Matthews Ridge
Port Kaituma
Baramita
Region 4
Georgetown (Eugene F. Correira International Airport), hub
Region 7
Baganara Island/Bartica
Bartica
Chi-Chi West
Ekereku Bottom
Ekereku Center
Imbaimadai
Kamarang
Kurupung
Olive Creek
Aurora
Region 8
Kaieteur Falls
Iwokrama Forest
Region 9
Orinduik Falls
Annai
Karinambo
Lethem

Suriname
Paramaribo (Zorg en Hoop Airport, Johan Adolf Pengel Airport)

References

External links

 Trans Guyana Airways

Airlines of Guyana
Airlines established in 1956
1956 establishments in British Guiana